Johan Hunæs (1911 – 1952) was a Norwegian sports shooter.

He won bronze medal in the 50 metre rifle three positions at the World Championships in 1952.

References

1911 births
1952 deaths
Norwegian male sport shooters
20th-century Norwegian people